Blue Ball, historically known as Pallas, is a small village in County Offaly, Ireland. The village lies to the southwest of Tullamore, at the junction of the N52 and the R357 roads, in the civil parish of Killoughy, 

Pallas Lough, also in the civil parish of Killoughy, is a small fishing lake located to the east of the village.

Butterfield Estate, near Blue Ball, hosts an annual agricultural and livestock show, the Tullamore Show.

See also
 List of towns and villages in Ireland

References

Towns and villages in County Offaly